Glowlab was an artist-run initiative that produced and presented experimental work related to cities and psychogeography, including interactive artworks and projects, events, exhibitions, and artists' gatherings. Brooklyn artist and curator Christina Ray launched Glowlab in 2002 as an experimental, web-based arts lab to support the visibility and expression of artists within her community. Ray produced exhibitions and projects including street-based performance work and site specific interventions both in her Williamsburg loft and in the greater urban environment. Glowlab moved from Brooklyn to Manhattan in 2008, opening an exhibition space at the edge of SoHo. As an innovative model advancing a niche collective of artists, thinkers and technologists, Glowlab produced over a dozen solo and group exhibitions, artist talks and performances. In early 2010, Ray re-launched Glowlab under her own name, continuing to focus on contemporary art, technology and creative projects examining the nature and psychology of the built environment.

In 2003, Glowlab's Christina Ray and David Mandl co-founded Psy-Geo-Conflux, currently known as the Conflux Festival, which takes place annually in New York City.  The Village Voice described Conflux as a "network of maverick artists and unorthodox urban investigators… making fresh, if underground, contributions to pedestrian life in New York City, and upping the ante on today’s fight for the soul of high-density metropolises.”

Projects and artists 

In addition to the annual Conflux Festival, Glowlab initiated a number of projects that focus on the exploration of public space.

One Block Radius, produced for The New Museum in 2004 by Christina Ray and David Mandl created a web based "psychogeographic portrait of a single Bowery block" with the help of media contributions from artists and the public. in Manhattan.  Open Lab, at Art Interactive in Cambridge, Massachusetts, was a nine-week series of "deceptively simple, playful investigations of site and the social fabric of Central Square, Cambridge".  At Southern Exposure in San Francisco, Ray and Kurt Bigenho invited people to step away from the intensive social networking of internet sites like Myspace and Friendster, and engage in non-social meetups in real space in their project Noso.

Artists and groups who have been associated with Glowlab include Wilfried Hou Je Bek, Bethany Bristow, D. Jean Hester, Brian House, Emily Conrad, Catherine D'Ignazio (aka Kanarinka), Steve Lambert, David Mandl, Ryota Matsumoto, Roberto Mollá, Marisa Olson, Mark Price, Sal Randolph, Jesse Shapins, Swoon, Holly Tavel, Jessica Thompson, Lee Walton, and Wooster Collective.

References

External links 
 Glowlab

Arts organizations based in New York City
Organizations based in New York (state)
Arts organizations established in 2002
2002 establishments in New York City